Word by Word: Emancipation and the Act of Writing is a 2013 historical book and analysis of a collection of writings by American slaves and befreed slaves. It was written by Christopher Hager and published by Harvard University Press.

Reception 

The book received the 2014 Frederick Douglass Book Prize from the Gilder Lehrman Center for the Study of Slavery, Resistance, and Abolition (Yale University).

See also 
 Maria Perkins letter

References

Sources 

 
 
 
 
 
 
 
 
 
 
 
 
 
 
 Kevin Eagan, "Interview with Christopher Hager, Author of Word by Word: Emancipation and the Act of Writing", Critical Margins, August 14, 2013.

External links 

 
 

2013 non-fiction books
Harvard University Press books
Books about African-American history
American history books
Non-fiction books about American slavery
History books about the United States